The 1888 Lehigh football team represented Lehigh University in the 1888 college football season. The team finished with an overall record of 10–2.

Schedule

References

Lehigh
Lehigh Mountain Hawks football seasons
Lehigh football